Murray Craig Anderson (born August 28, 1949) is a Canadian former ice hockey defenceman. He played 40 games in the National Hockey League with the Washington Capitals during the 1974–75 season. The rest of his career, which lasted from 1970 to 1977, was spent in the minor leagues.

Career 
Anderson was drafted in 1969 by the Montreal Canadiens, but spent his career in the minors. He was claimed by the Washington Capitals during the 1974 NHL Expansion Draft. He played 40 games in the team's inaugural season, and then another two seasons in the minors before retiring.

Career statistics

Regular season and playoffs

Awards
 WCHL All-Star Team – 1970

External links
 

1949 births
Living people
Canadian expatriate ice hockey players in the United States
Canadian ice hockey defencemen
Flin Flon Bombers players
Ice hockey people from Manitoba
Montreal Canadiens draft picks
New Haven Nighthawks players
Nova Scotia Voyageurs players
People from The Pas
Richmond Robins players
Selkirk Steelers players
Springfield Indians players
Tulsa Oilers (1964–1984) players
Washington Capitals players